DMWD may refer to:
 Department of Miscellaneous Weapons Development, a British Admiralty department during World War II
 DMWD (gene), a human gene protein which encodes dystrophia myotonica WD repeat-containing protein